Jack Egan (born 16 October 1998) is an English professional footballer who plays as a midfielder.

Career
After beginning his career at Carlisle United, he moved on loan to Workington in September 2017, and to Clitheroe in February 2018. On 1 February 2019, Brown was one of four young professionals to leave Carlisle by mutual consent.

References

1998 births
Living people
English footballers
Carlisle United F.C. players
Workington A.F.C. players
Clitheroe F.C. players
Association football midfielders